Buresh is a family name of Central European origin:

 Ivan Buresh (1885-1980), Bulgarian zoologist and entomologist, also known as Ivan Buresch
 Mike Buresh, chief meteorologist on Action News at WJAX-TV/WFOX-TV in Jacksonville, Florida.

Places 
 Buresh Archeological Site, in Kansas
 Buresh Farm, in Iowa, listed on the National Register of Historic Places.

See also 
 Bureš, the original Czech and Slovak family name
 Buresch (the German form of the name)
 a reference to Bulgarian zoologist Ivan Buresh or Buresch (in zoological nomenclature taxonomy)
 Karl Buresch (1878–1936), Austrian politician and Chancellor.